Shaanxi Provincial Institute of Archaeology is the official archaeological institute of China's Shaanxi Province. It operates an archaeological museum in Yanta District of Xi'an with a collection of more than 140,000 objects including bronzes, statues, pottery, porcelain, and books. There are nearly 130 thousand books in the library of the institute, making it one of the largest collections of books in the field of literature and archaeology in China.

History
Shaanxi Provincial Institute of Archaeology was founded in September 1958 with the name of "Institute of archaeology, Shaanxi branch of Chinese Academy of Sciences".

In 1963, the institute was under the jurisdiction of Shaanxi Provincial Academy of Social Sciences and was renamed "Shaanxi Provincial Institute of Archaeology" later.

In January 1970, Shaanxi Provincial Institute of Archaeology, former Shaanxi Museum and Shaanxi Cultural Relics Management Committee merged into the Shaanxi Museum.

In October 1978, after the Cultural Revolution, The General Office of the CPC Shaanxi Provincial Committee approved the restoration of the Shaanxi Provincial Institute of Archaeology. The institute is under the jurisdiction of Shaanxi Cultural Relics Bureau since 1984.

List of presidents

References

External links
   

Museums in Shaanxi
Museums established in 1958
1958 establishments in China
Buildings and structures in Xi'an
Tourist attractions in Xi'an
Archaeology of China